In the mathematical field of graph theory, a Hamiltonian path (or traceable path) is a path in an undirected or directed graph that visits each vertex exactly once. A Hamiltonian cycle (or Hamiltonian circuit) is a cycle that visits each vertex exactly once. A Hamiltonian path that starts and ends at adjacent vertices can be completed by adding one more edge to form a Hamiltonian cycle, and removing any edge from a Hamiltonian cycle produces a Hamiltonian path. Determining whether such paths and cycles exist in graphs (the Hamiltonian path problem and Hamiltonian cycle problem) are NP-complete.

Hamiltonian paths and cycles are named after William Rowan Hamilton who invented the icosian game, now also known as Hamilton's puzzle, which involves finding a Hamiltonian cycle in the edge graph of the dodecahedron.  Hamilton solved this problem using the icosian calculus, an algebraic structure based on roots of unity with many similarities to the quaternions (also invented by Hamilton).  This solution does not generalize to arbitrary graphs.

Despite being named after Hamilton, Hamiltonian cycles in polyhedra had also been studied a year earlier by Thomas Kirkman, who, in particular, gave an example of a polyhedron without Hamiltonian cycles. Even earlier, Hamiltonian cycles and paths in the knight's graph of the chessboard, the knight's tour, had been studied in the 9th century in Indian mathematics by Rudrata, and around the same time in Islamic mathematics by al-Adli ar-Rumi. In 18th century Europe, knight's tours were published by Abraham de Moivre and Leonhard Euler.

Definitions
A Hamiltonian path or traceable path is a path that visits each vertex of the graph exactly once. A graph that contains a Hamiltonian path is called a traceable graph. A graph is Hamiltonian-connected if for every pair of vertices there is a Hamiltonian path between the two vertices.

A Hamiltonian cycle, Hamiltonian circuit, vertex tour or graph cycle is a cycle that visits each vertex exactly once. A graph that contains a Hamiltonian cycle is called a Hamiltonian graph.

Similar notions may be defined for directed graphs, where each edge (arc) of a path or cycle can only be traced in a single direction (i.e., the vertices are connected with arrows and the edges traced "tail-to-head").

A Hamiltonian decomposition is an edge decomposition of a graph into Hamiltonian circuits.

A Hamilton maze is a type of logic puzzle in which the goal is to find the unique Hamiltonian cycle in a given graph.

Examples

 A complete graph with more than two vertices is Hamiltonian
 Every cycle graph is Hamiltonian
 Every tournament has an odd number of Hamiltonian paths (Rédei 1934)
 Every platonic solid, considered as a graph, is Hamiltonian
 The Cayley graph of a finite Coxeter group is Hamiltonian  (For more information on Hamiltonian paths in Cayley graphs, see the Lovász conjecture.)
 Cayley graphs on nilpotent groups with cyclic commutator subgroup are Hamiltonian.
 The flip graph of a convex polygon or equivalently, the rotation graph of binary trees, is Hamiltonian.

Properties

Any Hamiltonian cycle can be converted to a Hamiltonian path by removing one of its edges, but a Hamiltonian path can be extended to Hamiltonian cycle only if its endpoints are adjacent.

All Hamiltonian graphs are biconnected, but a biconnected graph need not be Hamiltonian (see, for example, the Petersen graph).

An Eulerian graph  (a connected graph in which every vertex has even degree) necessarily has an Euler tour, a closed walk passing through each edge of  exactly once. This tour corresponds to a Hamiltonian cycle in the line graph , so the line graph of every Eulerian graph is Hamiltonian. Line graphs may have other Hamiltonian cycles that do not correspond to Euler tours, and in particular the line graph  of every Hamiltonian graph  is itself Hamiltonian, regardless of whether the graph  is Eulerian.

A tournament (with more than two vertices) is Hamiltonian if and only if it is strongly connected.

These counts assume that cycles that are the same apart from their starting point are not counted separately.

Bondy–Chvátal theorem 

The best vertex degree characterization of Hamiltonian graphs was provided in 1972 by the Bondy–Chvátal theorem, which generalizes earlier results by G. A. Dirac (1952) and Øystein Ore. Both Dirac's and Ore's theorems can also be derived from Pósa's theorem (1962). Hamiltonicity has been widely studied with relation to various parameters such as graph density, toughness, forbidden subgraphs and distance among other parameters. Dirac and Ore's theorems basically state that a graph is Hamiltonian if it has enough edges.

As complete graphs are Hamiltonian, all graphs whose closure is complete are Hamiltonian, which is the content of the following earlier theorems by Dirac and Ore.

The following theorems can be regarded as directed versions:

The number of vertices must be doubled because each undirected edge corresponds to two directed arcs and thus the degree of a vertex in the directed graph is twice the degree in the undirected graph.

The above theorem can only recognize the existence of a Hamiltonian path in a graph and not a Hamiltonian Cycle.

Many of these results have analogues for balanced bipartite graphs, in which the vertex degrees are compared to the number of vertices on a single side of the bipartition rather than the number of vertices in the whole graph.

Existence of Hamiltonian cycles in planar graphs

The Hamiltonian cycle polynomial 

An algebraic representation of the Hamiltonian cycles of a given weighted digraph (whose arcs are assigned weights from a certain ground field) is the Hamiltonian cycle polynomial of its weighted adjacency matrix defined as the sum of the products of the arc weights of the digraph's Hamiltonian cycles. This polynomial is not identically zero as a function in the arc weights if and only if the digraph is Hamiltonian. The relationship between the computational complexities of computing it and computing the permanent was shown by Grigoriy Kogan.

See also

 Barnette's conjecture, an open problem on Hamiltonicity of cubic bipartite polyhedral graphs
 Eulerian path, a path through all edges in a graph
 Fleischner's theorem, on Hamiltonian squares of graphs
 Gray code
 Grinberg's theorem giving a necessary condition for planar graphs to have a Hamiltonian cycle
 Hamiltonian path problem, the computational problem of finding Hamiltonian paths
 Hypohamiltonian graph, a non-Hamiltonian graph in which every vertex-deleted subgraph is Hamiltonian
 Knight's tour, a Hamiltonian cycle in the knight's graph
 LCF notation for Hamiltonian cubic graphs.
 Lovász conjecture that vertex-transitive graphs are Hamiltonian
 Pancyclic graph, graphs with cycles of all lengths including a Hamiltonian cycle
 Seven Bridges of Königsberg
 Shortness exponent, a numerical measure of how far from Hamiltonian the graphs in a family can be
 Snake-in-the-box, the longest induced path in a hypercube
 Steinhaus–Johnson–Trotter algorithm for finding a Hamiltonian path in a permutohedron
 Subhamiltonian graph, a subgraph of a planar Hamiltonian graph
 Tait's conjecture (now known false) that 3-regular polyhedral graphs are Hamiltonian
 Travelling salesman problem

Notes

References 
 
.
.
.
.
.
.
.

External links
 
 Euler tour and Hamilton cycles

Computational problems in graph theory
NP-complete problems
Graph theory objects
 
William Rowan Hamilton